Joel 2 is the second chapter of the Book of Joel in the Hebrew Bible or the Old Testament of the Christian Bible. This book contains the prophecies attributed to the prophet Joel from the seventh century BCE, and is a part of the Book of the Twelve Minor Prophets. This chapter contains the allusions to "the Day of the " as an awesome and terrifying manifestation of God and his army, described as locusts, followed by "thick darkness" with "the sun turned to darkness and the moon to blood" and other terrible signs.

Text
The original text was written in Hebrew language. This chapter is divided into 32 verses.

Textual witnesses
Some early manuscripts containing the text of this chapter in Hebrew are of the Masoretic Text tradition, which includes the Codex Cairensis (895), the Petersburg Codex of the Prophets (916), Aleppo Codex (10th century), Codex Leningradensis (1008). Fragments containing parts of this chapter in Hebrew were found among the Dead Sea Scrolls, including 4Q78 (4QXIIc; 75–50 BCE) with extant verses 1, 8–23; 4Q82 (4QXIIg; 25 BCE) with extant verses 2–13; and Wadi Murabba'at Minor Prophets (Mur88; MurXIIProph; 75–100 CE) with extand verses 20, 26–27, 28–32 (verses 28–32 = 3:1–5 in Masoretic Text).

Ancient manuscripts in Koine Greek containing this chapter are mainly of the Septuagint version, including Codex Vaticanus (B; B; 4th century), Codex Sinaiticus (S; BHK: S; 4th century), Codex Alexandrinus (A; A; 5th century) and Codex Marchalianus (Q; Q; 6th century).

Chapter and verse numbering
The division of chapters and verses in the English Bibles (following Greek translations) differ from the traditional Hebrew text, as follows:

The locust plague, an act of God (2:1–11)
It gives the "image of the dense locust cloud" accompanying God's coming.

A call to repent (2:12–17)
The Lord calls the people to repentance, so the calamity could be averted.

An oracle of salvation (2:18–27)
The announcement of God's promises for the "remission of the plague" (verses 20, 25), "the return of fertility" (verses 19, 21–24), "the removal of shame" (verses 26–27), and "the restoration of the covenantal blessing" (verses 26–27).

Verse 25

Cross reference: Joel 1:4

Exact identity of these locusts is unknown, whether they represents "four varieties of insect" or "four various stages in the insect development" or "vernacular differences".

The Day of the Lord: The faithful are delivered (2:28–32; 3:1–5 in Masoretic Text)
The section extends to chapter 3, dealing with the Day of the Lord which brings the deliverance and the ultimate vindication of God's people in Judah.

Verse 28

Verse 29

Verse 30

Verse 31

Verse 32

Cross reference for verse 28–32: Acts 2:16–21

On the day of Pentecost, 50 days after the resurrection of Jesus, Apostle Peter stood up with the eleven and proclaimed to the crowd that miraculous events happened on that day were the fulfillment of the prophecy of Joel: "I will pour out my spirit". In Acts 2:17, it reads: "'And in the last days,' God says, 'I will pour out my spirit upon every sort of flesh, and your sons and your daughters will prophesy and your young men will see visions and your old men will dream dreams." He also mentions (Acts 2:15) that it was the third hour of the day (about 9:00 am). Acts 2:41 then reports: "Then they that gladly received his word were baptized: and the same day there were added unto them about three thousand souls." Paul the Apostle quotes this verse in Romans 10:13, "transferring the reference to the Messianic advent", to describe the universality of Jesus' deliverance without difference between Jew and Greek, that is, "salvation for all who call upon the name of the Lord", to become "citizens of Zion".

See also
 Joel 2:25 International
 Pentecost
 Simon Peter
 Related Bible parts: Psalm 51, Joel 1, Matthew 24, Acts 2, Acts 10, 1 Corinthians 14, Revelation 6

References

Sources

External links

Jewish translations:
 Yoel – Joel chapter 2 and chapter 3 (Judaica Press) translation with Rashi's commentary at Chabad.org
Christian translations:
Online Bible at GospelHall.org (ESV, KJV, Darby, American Standard Version, Bible in Basic English)
  Various versions

02